Contacyphon is a genus of marsh beetles in the family Scirtidae. There are about 17 described species in Contacyphon.

Species
 Contacyphon americanus (Pic, 1913)
 Contacyphon arcuatus (Hatch, 1962)
 Contacyphon brevicollis (LeConte, 1866)
 Contacyphon coarctatus (Paykull, 1799)
 Contacyphon cooperi (Schaeffer, 1931)
 Contacyphon exiguus (Horn, 1880)
 Contacyphon fuscescens (Klausnitzer, 1976)
 Contacyphon johni (Klausnitzer, 1976)
 Contacyphon nebulosus
 Contacyphon neopadi (Klausnitzer, 1976)
 Contacyphon neovariabilis (Klausnitzer, 1976)
 Contacyphon obscurus (Guérin-Méneville, 1843)
 Contacyphon ochreatus (Klausnitzer, 1976)
 Contacyphon padi (Linnaeus, 1758)
 Contacyphon perplexus (Blatchley, 1914)
 Contacyphon setulipennis (Klausnitzer, 1976)
 Contacyphon variabilis (Thunberg, 1785)

References

Further reading

 
 
 

Scirtoidea